</table>

 or Like the Wind is a one-shot manga by Tetsuya Chiba, published in Shojo Friend in 1969. In early 2016, Chiba began a crowdfunding campaign to raise money for a film adaptation. In March it met its goal of 2 million yen.

Plot
The manga takes place in a rural town in Japan. It focuses on Sanpei, a beekeeper and lone survivor of an accident that killed his entire family. While traveling alone, he meets a girl named Chiyo, who Sanpei helps after she is stung by a bee. Having nowhere else to go, he tries to begin a new life in her town. Sanpei begins to tend to an abandoned planting spot, but suddenly disappears afterwards. Soon the town begins to bloom with the flowers he planted, and Chiyo waits for Sanpei to return.

Voice cast
 Masako Nozawa as Sanpei
 Minami Fukuhara as Chiyo
 Hana Takeda as Kamekichi
 Asako as Sabu
 Aine Shiono as Kunio
 Megu Ashiro as Shige
 Yuri Noguchi as Sachi
 Junpei Asashina as Sensei
 Reiko Suzuki as Osen
 Hiroki Maeda as Tora
 Toshiya Chiba as Masakichi
 Takayuki Yoshi as Jisuke
 Masaaki Yano as Mosaku
 Megumi Miyatsu as Tsune
 Norio Takaku as Sanpei's Father
 Shiori Inoue as Otome
 Michiyo Yanagisawa as Narrator

References

External links
 

1969 manga
Kodansha manga
Shōjo manga
One-shot manga